Indah Setyani (born October 9, 1986) is an Indonesian TV presenter actress and modelling. She is a presenter in the "iSeleb" infotainment program on iNews.

Profile 
Indah Setyani is an alumnus of the IPB University, majoring in Management. She began debut her television career in 2010 when she became a presenter in the Lensa Olahraga (Sport Lens) live show on ANTV.

Education 

 IPB University, Bachelor's degree (Gratuated)

Filmography

Movies

TV Presenter 

 iSeleb - iNews
  - ANTV
  - RCTI
  - tvOne
  - Kompas TV
  - iNews
  - iNews
  - iNews
  - Rajawali Televisi
  - iNews
  - Metro TV
  - NET.
  - NET.
  - ANTV
  - NET.

References 

1986 births
Living people
Javanese people
People from Jakarta
Bogor Agricultural University alumni
Indonesian television presenters
Indonesian women television presenters
Indonesian sports announcers